John Andrew Reginald Lenman FRSE FRCPE (1924 – 3 June 1985) was a British neurologist and medical author.

Life

He was born at Shillong in India in 1924, the son of the Bishop of Bhagalpur. He was educated at the Rudolph Steiner School in London. He then studied medicine at the University of Edinburgh, graduating with an MB ChB in 1948. He undertook further training under Sir Stanley Davidson and Professor Norman Dott.

During his two years National Service he served with the RAF as a clinical pathologist, based in Singapore.

From 1960 he lectured in neurology at the University of Dundee. In 1979 he was elected a Fellow of the Royal Society of Edinburgh. His proposers were Anthony Elliot Ritchie, Sir Ian George Wilson Hill, Martin Smellie and Norrie Everitt.

He died after a prolonged illness on 3 June 1985.

Family

He was married to Frances and had three daughters and one son.

Publications
See

Clinical Electromyography (1970) co-written with Anthony Elliot Ritchie
Clinical Neurophysiology (1975)
Neurological Therapeutics (1981)

References

1924 births
1985 deaths
British neurologists
Academics of the University of Dundee
Fellows of the Royal Society of Edinburgh
20th-century non-fiction writers
British people in colonial India